The 1924 Akron football team was an American football team that represented the University of Akron in the Ohio Athletic Conference during the 1924 college football season. In its first season under head coach James W. Coleman, the team compiled a 5–3 record (3–2 against conference opponents) and outscored opponents by a total of 89 to 75. Ken Mason was the team captain.

Schedule

References

Akron
Akron Zips football seasons
Akron football